Ceratapion is a genus of beetles belonging to the family Apionidae.

The species of this genus are found in Europe and Northern America.

Species:
 Ceratapion armatum (Gerstaecker, 1854) 
 Ceratapion austriacum (Wagner, 1904)

References

Brentidae
Weevil genera